Mur (also Romanized as Mūr) is a village in Mazinan Rural District, Central District, Davarzan County, Razavi Khorasan Province, Iran. At the 2006 census, its population was 203, in 62 families.

References 

Populated places in Davarzan County